M. Blash (born 1978) is an American film director, screenwriter, actor, and visual artist. He has written and directed several independent films, including the improvisational drama Lying (2006), and the dramatic thriller The Wait (2013).

Biography
Blash was born in 1978 in southern California, and raised in Portland, Oregon. He attended New York University and the School of Visual Arts, as well as Charles University in Prague.

His directorial debut, Lying (2006), was completed for a budget of $150,000 in upstate New York, and starred Jena Malone, Chloë Sevigny, and Leelee Sobieski. The film premiered at the Directors' Fortnight at the 2006 Cannes Film Festival.  In 2007, he had a minor role in Gus van Sant's Paranoid Park.

Blash has also a visual artist, and has exhibited his drawings at the Bullseye Gallery in Portland. In 2008, a series of his drawings were published in The New York Times. His second film, the supernatural drama The Wait (2013), also starred Sevigny and Malone, as well as Luke Grimes and Josh Hamilton.

Filmography

References

External links

1978 births
Male actors from Portland, Oregon
Artists from Portland, Oregon
Writers from Portland, Oregon
Film directors from Oregon
Living people